The National Democratic and Labour Party, usually abbreviated to National Democratic Party (NDP), was a short-lived political party in the United Kingdom.  Its predecessors were the British Workers' National League, and the Socialist National Defence Committee.

History
The party's origins lay in a split by the right wing of the British Socialist Party, primarily over issues raised by the First World War. In 1915, Victor Fisher formed the Socialist National Defence Committee along with Alexander M. Thompson and Robert Blatchford. They supported "the eternal idea of nationality" and aimed to promote "socialist measures in the war effort".  The Committee was supported by John Hodge, George Henry Roberts, and for a time by Henry Hyndman who subsequently formed his own party, the National Socialist Party.  

In 1916, this committee formed the British Workers League. It described itself as a "patriotic labour" group, and focused on support for the war and the British Empire and opposition to Little Englander and Cobdenite laissez-faire economics. The League was subsidised by Waldorf Astor through Lord Milner, who consulted with Fisher during the war. The League was supported by Labour MPs such as James O'Grady, Stephen Walsh and William Abraham.

The League sought to challenge pacificist Parliamentary candidates; this caused a rupture with the Labour Party. Eleven out of thirty-eight of the Labour Parliamentary MPs showed support for the British Workers League; however, many later returned to the Labour Party.

The British Workers League reconstituted itself in 1918 as the National Democratic and Labour Party, with the support of George Barnes, MP for Glasgow Blackfriars and Hutchesontown, when he resigned from the Labour Party (Barnes, however, never stood for election under the NDP banner, and was re-elected in 1918 as a Coalition Labour MP). The NDP policy was described as follows, 'Support of the Coalition Government and the war effort.  Broadly socialist in outlook and claimed to represent "the patriotic working class." It was bitterly opposed to the pacifist elements within the Labour Party.'  The group gained the support of the Musicians' Union and parts of other unions, including some sections of the Miners' Federation of Great Britain. It was primarily funded by Lloyd George Coalition Liberals.

At its high water mark, the party fielded twenty-eight candidates in the 1918 general election—twenty of them on the Coalition Coupon—and won ten seats. After the election, Clement Edwards was elected chairman of the NDP in parliament.

The National Democratic and Labour's remaining MPs joined the National Liberal Party and stood under that label in the 1922 general election. The National Democratic and Labour Party was wound up in 1923, but a grouping continued as the Empire Citizens' League from 1925 until the late 1920s.  Its journal was renamed the Empire Citizen, which ceased publication in September 1927. Victor Fisher stood, unsuccessfully, for the Conservative Party.

Election results

1918 UK general election

Some prominent members such as George Barnes were elected as Coalition Labour.  Taylor ran as a joint NDP-Liberal candidate, and sat as a Coalition Liberal MP after election.

By-elections, 1918-1922

Turnour ran as a joint NDP-Conservative candidate.

Footnotes

References 

 Crick, Martin, History of the Socialist-Democratic Federation", Keele, UK: Keele University Press, 1994
 Callaghan, John, "Socialism in Britain", Hoboken, NJ (USA): Blackwell, 1990  
 Pugh, Martin, "Speak for Britain! A New History of the Labour Party", London: The Bodley Head, 2010
 Lockwood, P.A., The Historical Journal, Vol VII, "Milner's Entry into the War Cabinet, December 1916", Cambridge: University Press, 1964
 Barberis, Peter, John McHugh and Mike Tyldesley: Encyclopedia of British and Irish Political Organizations, "British Workers League", London: Continuum, 2005
 Marlowe, John, Milner, Apostle of Empire, London: Hamish Hamilton, 1976   
 Thompson, J. Lee, "Forgotten Patriot: a life of Alfred, Viscount Milner of St. James's and Cape Town, 1854-1925", Cranbury, NJ (USA): Rosemont, 2007
 Roy, Douglas, The Historical Journal, Vol. XV, "The National Democratic Party and the British Worker's League", Cambridge: University Press, 1972
 Craig, F. W. S., "Minor Parties in British By-Elections, 1885-1974", London: MacMillan, 1975

 Other Reading 
David Butler and Gareth Butler, British Political Facts 7th Ed, 1900-1994''

Defunct political parties in the United Kingdom
Labour parties in the United Kingdom
Labour Party (UK) breakaway groups
Nationalist parties in the United Kingdom
Political parties established in 1918
Political parties disestablished in 1923
1918 establishments in the United Kingdom
1923 disestablishments in the United Kingdom